The Old Northwood Historic District is a U.S. historic district (designated as such on April 14, 1994) located in West Palm Beach, Florida. The district is bounded by Broadway, North Dixie Highway and 26th and 35th Streets. It contains 320 historic buildings.

References

External links
 Palm Beach County listings at National Register of Historic Places

National Register of Historic Places in Palm Beach County, Florida
Historic districts on the National Register of Historic Places in Florida
West Palm Beach, Florida
Historic districts in Palm Beach County, Florida